Craspedia is a genus of flowering plants in the family Asteraceae commonly known as billy buttons and woollyheads. They are native to Australia and New Zealand where they grow in a variety of habitats from sea level to the Alps. The genus is found in every state of Australia but not in the Northern Territory. In New Zealand, Craspedia is found from East Cape on the North Island south to Stewart Island. It also occurs on Campbell Island and the Chatham Islands.

Description 

Craspedia are rosette-forming herbs with compound capitula borne on erect, unbranched scapes. The capitula are hemispherical to spherical heads of tiny flowers. Most species are perennial; one species is recorded as an annual (Craspedia haplorrhiza). The leaves have considerable variation in form, ranging in colour from white to green, and are often covered in fine hairs.

A closely related genus is Pycnosorus, also often called billy buttons. The genera can be distinguished by the attachment of individual flower heads to the compound heads; in Pycnosorus they are directly attached, and in Craspedia they arise on small stalks. The two genera may actually be monophyletic.

Taxonomy 

The genus Craspedia was first described by Johann Georg Adam Forster in 1786. It is placed within the family Asteraceae, tribe Gnaphalieae, with about 23 species. The original description included only one species, Craspedia uniflora. Early authors included Pycnosorus, which was later segregated. Molecular phylogeny suggested the two genera were sister clades, but there is some evidence that the two genera may in fact be monophyletic.

List of species 

According to the Global Compositae Checklist

Etymology 

The genus is named for the Greek Kraspedon, meaning an edge, hem or border, because of the woolly fringes of the leaves belonging to the type species.

Biogeography and evolution 

There are two centres of diversity in Craspedia, both associated with upland areas. One of these is in the alpine and subalpine zone of Kosciuszko National Park in Australia, where seven species are found. The other centre is a larger area on the northwestern South Island of New Zealand, where several species grow.

Ecology 

Species of Craspedia are found in a wide range of habitats from coastal to alpine and are generally plants of open areas, sometimes ruderal. Observations of some Australian species suggest they re-establish well after fire. In Australia Craspedia are commonly found growing in forest habitat, whereas in New Zealand they are generally excluded from closed Nothofagus forests. Craspedia species may occur in dense, widespread populations in mainland Australia, but generally not in New Zealand or Tasmania.
Most Australian non-alpine species are found in native grasslands and shrublands associated with Eucalyptus forests. Alpine species occur in Tasmania. In New Zealand, species can be found on coastal sand dunes, wetlands, fellfields, and greywacke rock scree.

Craspedia grow in a wide range of soil types, including sands, gravels, clays, and loams, which are derived from different geologies across a broad rainfall gradient. They appear to be intolerant only of very infertile and acidic soils. This is apparent in the absence of Craspedia from parts of western Tasmania which are characterised by soils derived from pre-Cambrian quartzose rock. These sandy, infertile soils are dominated by a wet heath ecosystem known as buttongrass moorland.

Cultivation 

Craspedia is hardy to USDA zones 9–11. It can be propagated by cutting a rosette from a clump, but generally seed is a more reliable and rapid method.  Seeds will sprout in days on germination media. Plants are generally self-fertile. The alpine species need regular water and excellent drainage.  All species prefer cool roots; surrounding the plants with rock, gravel, or sand provides better conditions. A plant will start growing as a single rosette, and each rosette generally produces one flower stalk. Cultivars include ‘Golf Beauty’.

Uses 

Craspedia is grown both as an ornamental garden plant, and floriculture for cut flowers and floral arrangements, including dried flowers. Africa is a source of exports.

References

Bibliography

Articles and books

Websites 

 
 
 
 
 
 

 Databases
 
 
 
 
 

 Flora

External links 

Gnaphalieae
Asteraceae genera